Dune 7 may refer to:

 Dune 7, working title of the seventh book in the Dune series by Frank Herbert, eventually written by Brian Herbert and Kevin J. Anderson as two books:
Hunters of Dune (2006) 
Sandworms of Dune (2007)
 Dune 7: Cartea Brundurilor (1997) a novel by Sebastian A. Corn 
 Dune 7 (Namibia), a very large sand dune and tourist attraction at Walvis Bay